Konrad Beyreuther (born 14 May 1941) is a German molecular biologist and chemist known for his work on neurodegenerative diseases.

Life 
Konrad Bayreuther was the son of an evangelical pastor. He studied chemistry at the Ludwigs-Maximilians-Universität (LMU) in Munich. He wrote his PhD Thesis at the Max-Planck Institut für Biochemie in Munich. Until 1978 he was a scientific employee at the Institut for genetics at the university of Cologne.

Until 1987 he was a professor at the university of Cologne. From 1987 onwards he has held various positions at the University of Heidelberg.

Works  
Beyreuther's work with Colin L. Masters implicated amyloid precursor protein (APP) as a possible precursor of Alzheimer's disease. Together with British researchers, he discovered the pathogenic prion that causes BSE, also known as mad cow disease, in 1998.

Awards
In 1990, he won the Metlife Foundation Award for Medical Research in Alzheimer's Disease with Robert D. Terry and was awarded the Potamkin Prize jointly with Masters. In 1997 they were awarded the King Faisal International Prize in Medicine together with James F. Gusella for contributions to the understanding of neurodegenerative diseases. Bayreuther has been elected to the German Academy of Sciences Leopoldina, the Heidelberg Academy for Sciences and Humanities, and the Göttingen Academy of Sciences. He is a recipient of the Order of Merit of Baden-Württemberg and the Cross of the Order of Merit of the Federal Republic of Germany.

References

1941 births
German molecular biologists
20th-century German chemists
Alzheimer's disease researchers
Biography articles needing translation from German Wikipedia
Living people
Recipients of the Cross of the Order of Merit of the Federal Republic of Germany
Recipients of the Order of Merit of Baden-Württemberg
Members of the Göttingen Academy of Sciences and Humanities